Scott Lorenz (born June 23, 1987) is an American soccer player.

Career

College and Amateur
Lorenz attended Barrington High School. At Barrington he played on both the soccer and volleyball teams. Playing volleyball he won all-area and all-conference honors. He also played club soccer for FC 96ers and the Chicago Sockers before playing college soccer at the University of Wisconsin. At UW he was twice named to the All-Big Ten Second Team, as a junior in 2008 and as a senior in 2009, and finished his collegiate career with 14 goals in 71 appearances for the Badgers.

During his college years Lorenz also played with the Princeton 56ers and Chicago Fire NPSL in the National Premier Soccer League.

Professional
Undrafted out of college, Lorenz signed his first professional contract in 2010 when he was signed by the NSC Minnesota Stars of the USSF Division 2 Professional League. He made his professional debut on May 22, 2010 in a game against Miami FC, and went on to play 19 games for the Stars in his debut pro season.

Lorenz signed with Major League Soccer outfit Sporting Kansas City on March 1, 2011, and made his MLS debut on March 26, 2011 in a 3-2 loss to the Chicago Fire.

On July 29, 2011, Sporting Kansas City announced that Lorenz would be sent on-loan to his former club NSC Minnesota Stars for the remainder of the 2011 season. Lorenz re-joined Kansas City when the loan was terminated on September 8, 2011. Lorenz was waived by Kansas City on November 23, 2011.

Lorenz signed with Fort Lauderdale Strikers of the North American Soccer League on February 13, 2012.

References

External links
 Wisconsin profile

1985 births
Living people
American soccer players
Minnesota United FC (2010–2016) players
Sporting Kansas City players
Fort Lauderdale Strikers players
Wisconsin Badgers men's soccer players
USSF Division 2 Professional League players
Major League Soccer players
North American Soccer League players
Association football defenders
United Premier Soccer League players
Princeton 56ers players
National Premier Soccer League players
Soccer players from Chicago
People from Lake County, Illinois